Mohamed Nabil Bellat (born January 29, 1982 in Hussein Dey) is an Algerian footballer who played as a midfielder for clubs including USM El Harrach of the Algerian Ligue Professionnelle 1.

References

1982 births
Living people
People from Hussein Dey (commune)
Algerian footballers
JS Kabylie players
NA Hussein Dey players
CR Belouizdad players
USM El Harrach players
Algerian Ligue Professionnelle 1 players
Competitors at the 2001 Mediterranean Games
Association footballers not categorized by position
Mediterranean Games competitors for Algeria
21st-century Algerian people